This is a list of Wikipedia articles that are relevant to the topic of nuclear power and nuclear weapons history in the US state of California. The list includes articles about groups that make up the anti-nuclear movement, prominent activists, court cases, a book documenting the state's history, nuclear power stations and the Department of Energy's laboratories in the state.   

Abalone Alliance
Alliance for Nuclear Responsibility
Anti-nuclear movement in California
Bodega Bay Nuclear Power Plant
Conservation Fallout: Nuclear Protest at Diablo Canyon
David Brower quit the Sierra Club over Diablo Canyon
Critical Masses: Opposition to Nuclear Power in California, 1958–1978
Diablo Canyon earthquake vulnerability
Diablo Canyon Power Plant
Etcheverry Hall
GE Three
General Atomics
Humboldt Bay Nuclear Power Plant
John Gofman
Lawrence Livermore National Laboratory
Mark 22 nuclear bomb
Mothers for Peace
Pacific Gas and Electric Company
Pacific Gas & Electric Co. v. State Energy Resources Conservation and Development Commission
Rancho Seco Nuclear Generating Station
San Onofre Nuclear Generating Station
Shoreline Fault
Sodium Reactor Experiment
Southern California Edison
Sundesert Nuclear Power Plant
UGM-27 Polaris
Vallecitos Nuclear Center

California-related lists
Energy in California
Energy-related lists
Environment of California
California nuclear issues
California
California
Nuclear issues in California